Carmen is a 2022 musical drama film directed by Benjamin Millepied in his feature directorial debut from a screenplay by Alexander Dinelaris Jr.,  and Millepied from a screen story by Millepied and Barrère. The film had its world premiere at the Toronto International Film Festival on 11 September 2022. It is set to be released in France on 14 June 2023 by Pathé Distribution.

Though described as Millepied's take on Bizet's opera of the same name, it is "a complete re-imagining" that ignores the opera's plot and setting; all that remains are "selected lyrics" from the opera's libretto sung in the original French by a choir as background to one scene between the two leads. The film features an original score composed by Nicholas Britell and songs written and composed by Brittell, Julieta Venegas, Taura Stinson and Tracy "The DOC" Curry.

Premise
Carmen flees the Mexican desert, is rescued by Aidan, and together they struggle to evade the authorities as they head for Los Angeles.

Cast
 Melissa Barrera as Carmen
 Paul Mescal as Aidan
 Rossy de Palma as Masilda
 Tracy "The DOC" Curry

Production
In May 2017, Benjamin Millepied was set to make his feature film directorial debut with the film version of Carmen for Chapter 2, originally conceived as "a modern-day reimagining of one of the world's most celebrated operas". Once completed, Millepied recognized his film was less an adaptation than "a version of Bizet's tragedy from a parallel universe".  and Millepied will write the script. In May 2019, Sony Pictures Classics acquired distribution rights for the film and Nilo Cruz will write the script. In November 2020, Alexander Dinelaris Jr. was revealed to have co-written the script with Millepied and Loïc Barrère.

Cast
In May 2019, it was announced that Melissa Barrera and Jamie Dornan were cast as Carmen and Aidan, respectively. In November 2020, Paul Mescal replaced Dornan and Rossy de Palma was cast in the film.

Filming
Principal photography commenced on 18 January 2021 in Australia with Jörg Widmer as the cinematographer, and wrapped in early March 2021.

Music
Nicholas Britell composed the score and co-wrote the songs with Julieta Venegas, Taura Stinson and Tracy "The DOC" Curry. Lynn Fainchtein served as music producer and music supervisor.

Release
The film had its world premiere at the Toronto International Film Festival on 11 September 2022. It is scheduled for a limited theatrical release in the United States on 21 April 2023 by Sony Pictures Classics. It is set to be released theatrically in France on 14 June 2023 by Pathé Distribution.

References

External links
 

2022 films
2022 drama films
2020s Australian films
2020s English-language films
2020s French films
2020s musical drama films
2020s Spanish-language films
Australian musical drama films
English-language French films
Films based on Carmen
Films based on novellas
Films based on poems
Films scored by Nicholas Britell
Films shot in Australia
French musical drama films
Sony Pictures Classics films
Spanish-language French films